The Lyceum International School, popularly known as LIS and its students as Lyceumers, is a network of schools in Sri Lanka providing both primary and secondary education.

History
Lyceum International School was founded by Mohan Lal Grero in 1993. At its inception, Lyceum International School had only seven students and five teachers. The motto is derived from the Ancient Greek aphorism "Know thyself". The motto itself has no application within the curriculum or teaching style. Today, Lyceum is made up of the parent branch in Nugegoda and eight branch schools in Kandana, Panadura, Wattala, Ratnapura, Gampaha, Nuwara Eliya, Anuradhapura and Kurunegala.

Lyceum Academy for Higher Education was founded by its managing director Mohan Lal Grero on 7 September 1989.  This was situated at Raymond Road, Nugegoda where the present campus stands. Initially, Lyceum had only two classrooms and the organization had only external students.

The Lyceum International Schools Network currently has over 20,000 students.

Curriculum
Lyceum prepares its senior school students to sit for the Cambridge International Examinations for their Ordinary Levels and Advanced Level Examinations endorsed by the University of Cambridge, in the United Kingdom, and by the University of Cambridge Local Examinations Syndicate (UCLES), its examination body.

Since 2010, students are given the option of choosing between the Cambridge syllabus or the National syllabus in the English language, which gives them the opportunity to be eligible for higher education at public universities in Sri Lanka.

Lyceum has consistently produced some of the island's best examination results, and its students have successfully been enrolled in the world's best universities.

Lyceum has launched the first phase of E-Learning at the Lyceum Group along with the instigation of curfew, on the 16th of March 2020.

Achievements

Model United Nations Club
Lyceum is an annual participant of COMUN (Colombo Model United Nations) and SLMUN (Sri Lanka Model United Nations). The lyceum delegation won the best school and best delegation award in the COMUN 2011 Conference along with several other awards and has also been runners up in most of the previous conferences. Lyceum International School Wattala Branch also has participated in COMUN 2012 Conference winning GA2 Best Delegate Award.

Lyceum International School Nugegoda Branch annually Hosts LISMUN Conference.

Inter International Schools Athletic Championship (ISAC)
The Lyceum branches of schools have won the ISAC consecutively along with Lyceum Nugegoda hosting the ISAC for the ninth time at the Mahinda Rajapakse Stadium, Diyagama, and Gateway College Colombo also playing a part in hosting the ISAC nine times.

References 

Educational institutions established in 1993
International schools in Sri Lanka
Cambridge schools in Sri Lanka
1993 establishments in Sri Lanka